Vicente Antonio Gambardella Garaffo (born October 5, 1932 in Argentina) is a former Argentine-Chilean footballer who played for clubs of Argentina and Chile.

Teams
  Quilmes 1945-1950
  River Plate 1951-1954
  Huracán 1955-1956
  Universidad Católica 1957-1958
  Estudiantes de La Plata 1959
  Ferro Carril Oeste 1960

External links
 

1932 births
Living people
Argentine footballers
Argentine expatriate footballers
Club Atlético Huracán footballers
Quilmes Atlético Club footballers
Club Atlético River Plate footballers
Ferro Carril Oeste footballers
Estudiantes de La Plata footballers
Club Deportivo Universidad Católica footballers
Chilean Primera División players
Expatriate footballers in Chile
Association footballers not categorized by position